The 1967–68 Copa México is the 52nd staging of the Copa México.

The competition started on March 19, 1968, and concluded on May 18, 1968, with the final, played at the Estadio Olímpico Universitario in Mexico City, in which Atlas lifted the trophy for the fourth time ever with a 2-1 victory over Veracruz.

This edition was played by 16 teams, first played a group stage, later a knock-out stage.

Group stage

Group 1

Results

Group 2

Results

Group 3

Results

Group 4

Results

Final stage

Semifinals
First Leg

Second Leg

Final

References
Mexico - Statistics of Copa México for the 1967–68 season. (RSSSF)

Copa MX
Cop
1967–68 domestic association football leagues